Abies procera, the noble fir, also called red fir and Christmas tree, is a species of fir native to the Cascade Range and Pacific Coast Ranges of the northwestern Pacific Coast of the United States.

Description
They are arranged spirally on the shoot, but twisted slightly S-shaped to be upcurved above the shoot. Viable seeds are only produced every few years.

The species can grow for up to 200 years.

Taxonomy
David Douglas discovered the species in the Cascade Range in the early 19th century, calling it the "noble fir".

The specific epithet procera means "tall". It is the world's tallest true fir.

Distribution
The species is native to the Cascade Range and Pacific Coast Ranges of western Washington and Oregon, as well as the extreme northwest of California.

Ecology
The species is very closely related to Abies magnifica (red fir), which replaces it farther southeast in southernmost Oregon and California, being best distinguished by the leaves having a groove along the midrib on the upper side; red fir does not show this. Red fir also tends to have the leaves less closely packed, with the shoot bark visible between the leaves, whereas the shoot is largely hidden in noble fir. Red fir cones also mostly have shorter bracts, except in A. magnifica var. shastensis (Shasta red fir); this variety hybridizes with noble fir and may itself be a hybrid between noble fir and red fir. As opposed to Shasta red fir, noble fir is shade-intolerant, leaving its lower trunk branchless.

Noble fir occurs with Douglas-fir and western hemlock at middle elevations, and with Pacific silver fir and mountain hemlock at higher elevations. It occurs in cool, humid areas similar to those occupied by Pacific silver fir. While it benefits from occasional disturbances (e.g. the 1980 eruption of Mount St. Helens), it is very susceptible to fire but is usually protected by its moist environment. It is relatively resistant to damage from wind, insects or diseases. Although the roots grow slowly, it can survive in very rocky soil as long as it is moist.

Uses
The Paiute used the foliage to treat coughs and colds.

The superior light and strong wood was recognized early by loggers, who called it "larch" to avoid conflating it with inferior firs. The wood is used for specialized applications such as ladders, general structural purposes and paper manufacture. It may have been used for the frames of the Royal Air Force's Mosquito bombers during World War II.

David Douglas sent noble fir seeds to Britain in 1830, introducing it to horticulturalists. It is a popular and favored Christmas tree. The prostrate grey cultivar A. procera (Glauca Group) 'Glauca Prostrata' has gained the Royal Horticultural Society's Award of Garden Merit.

References

Further reading

External links

 USDA Plants Profile for Abies procera (noble fir)
 Interactive Distribution Map of Abies procera
 Abies procera—Gymnosperm Database
 Jepson Manual Treatment: Abies procera
 photos of Abies procera trees—Arboretum de Villardebelle
 photos of foliage and cones—Arboretum de Villardebelle
 Abies procera—U.C. Photo gallery

procera
Flora of the Cascade Range
Flora of the Klamath Mountains
Least concern flora of the United States
Trees of the Northwestern United States
Trees of the United States
Trees of the West Coast of the United States
Trees of North America
Trees of the Western United States